Olha Vitaliiivna Stefanishyna (born 29 October 1985) is a Ukrainian lawyer and civil servant. On 4 June 2020, she was appointed as the deputy prime minister for European and Euro-Atlantic integration.

Career 
In 2008, Stefanishyna graduated from the Institute of International Relations of the University of Kyiv (in international law and English translator). In 2016, she received a specialist degree in Finance and Credit from Odesa National Economics University.

Stefanishyna, after a short career as legal adviser, became an employee of the Ministry of Justice at the end of 2007.

From March to December 2017, Stefanishyna worked as the director of the Government Office for European and Euro-Atlantic Integration of the Cabinet of Ministers Secretariat.

In December 2017, she was appointed director general of the Government Office for the Coordination of European and Euro-Atlantic Integration of the Secretariat. Stefanishyna was awarded the Certificate of Honor of the Cabinet of Ministers.

In the 2019 Ukrainian parliamentary election Stefanishyna stood for election to parliament as number 25 on the party list of Ukrainian Strategy. In this election Ukrainian Strategy failed to win any parliamentary seats gaining 2.41% of the total votes while the election had a 5% election threshold. (The party also failed to win a constituency seat.) After the election she worked for the Ilyashev & Partners Law Firm.

On 4 June 2020 Stefanishyna was appointed as the deputy prime minister for European and Euro-Atlantic Integration in the Shmyhal Government.

Has the fifth rank of a civil servant. Member of the council of political party Servant of the people.

Stefanishyna ranks 45th place in the rating of "100 most influential Ukrainians" in 2021 and 14th place in the ranking of "100 most influential women of Ukraine in 2021" by Focus magazine. According to legal newspaper Yurydychna Gazeta in 2021 she ranks in the top 10 successful lawyers-politicians.

As deputy prime minister for European and Euro-Atlantic integration of Ukraine, Stefanishyna is heading a number of coordination mechanisms in the government, in particular:

 A Chair of the Commission for Coordination of Euro-Atlantic Integration of Ukraine
 A Chair of the Commission for Equal Rights for Women and Men
 A Chair of the working group for approach agreement to the application of the carbon border adjustment mechanism to Ukraine in consultation with the European Commission
 A Chair of the Ukrainian delegation for participation in the United Nations Climate Change Conference (COP26) in Glasgow 
 A Chair of the Interagency Working Group on Coordination of Integrated Border Management 
 Co-chair of the High-Level Dialogue Working Group on the European Green Deal and Ukraine's Green Transition

The dialogue was launched in February 2021 by the prime minister of Ukraine Denys Shmyhal and the vice-president of the European Commission on the European Green Deal Frans Timmermans.

 Deputy Head of the Commission for Coordination of the Implementation of the Association Agreement 
 Deputy Head of the Interministerial Working Group on Coordination of Climate Change in the framework of the European Commission's initiative “European Green Deal”. Develops the Ukraine-EU dialogue on Ukraine's involvement in the processes of forming the European Green Deal and further synchronization of national climate change policy with European regulation 
 Member of the National Security and Defense Council of Ukraine
 Member of the National Reform Council 
 Member of the council of political party “Слуга народу” (Sluga narodu) “Servant of the people”

The list of Commissions chaired from Ukrainian side by the Deputy Prime Minister for European and Euro-Atlantic Integration of Ukraine:

 Ukrainian-Slovak Joint Commission on economic, industrial and scientific-technical cooperation
 Ukrainian-German High Level Group on economic cooperation

See also 
 Shmyhal Government

References

External links 
 Stefanishyna Olha. Government of Ukraine website

1985 births
Living people
Politicians from Odesa
Taras Shevchenko National University of Kyiv, Institute of International Relations alumni
Odesa National Economics University alumni
Ukrainian women lawyers
21st-century Ukrainian lawyers
Ukrainian civil servants
Vice Prime Ministers of Ukraine
European integration ministers of Ukraine
Women government ministers of Ukraine
21st-century Ukrainian politicians
21st-century Ukrainian women politicians
21st-century women lawyers
Servant of the People (political party) politicians
Recipients of the Honorary Diploma of the Cabinet of Ministers of Ukraine
Eastern Orthodox Christians from Ukraine